Keiran Kerr   (born 8 October 1979) is a former professional rugby league footballer who played for the St. George Illawarra Dragons, Widnes Vikings and Wests Tigers.

References

Australian rugby league players
St. George Illawarra Dragons players
Wests Tigers players
Widnes Vikings players
Living people
1979 births
Rugby league halfbacks
Rugby league players from Sydney